Kaser-e Pishkamar (also Romanized as Kaser-e Pīshkamar) is a village in Zavkuh Rural District, Pishkamar District, Kalaleh County, Golestan Province, Iran. At the 2006 census, its population was 708, in 166 families.

References 

Populated places in Kalaleh County